Jacuípe is a municipality located in the Brazilian state of Alagoas. Its population is 7,006 (2020) and its area is 217 km².

References

Municipalities in Alagoas